Alan T. Charlie Johnson is an American physicist, professor of Physics and Astronomy at the University of Pennsylvania, and the Director of the Nano/Bio Interface Center at the University of Pennsylvania.

Johnson's research spans experimental nanoscale physics, combining nanotechnology and biophysics. His research is involved specifically in transport within nanostructures and carbon nanotubes, which revolves around graphene, DNA, synthetic proteins, and other biomolecules. His research also involves the development of scanning probe techniques to measure electronic properties in nanomaterials and nanodevices.

Johnson is also the Founding Executive Editor of AIP Advances and the co-founder of Graphene Frontiers, LLC.

Education
Johnson received his B.S. in physics from Stanford University in 1984 before going on to earn his Ph.D. in physics from Harvard in 1990, under the supervision of Michael Tinkham.  His thesis was entitled "Effect of leads and quantum fluctuations on small superconducting tunnel junctions."  During his time at Harvard, Johnson worked as a research assistant, where he started working on nanodevices.  He served as a post-doctoral fellow at Delft University of Technology in the Netherlands from 1990 to 1992 before working as a post-doc fellow at National Institute of Standards and Technology in Boulder, Colorado.

Academic work

Professorship at Penn
In 1994, Johnson began working at the University of Pennsylvania in the School of Arts and Sciences. He was promoted from assistant professor to associate professor in 2001. In 2002, Johnson received two secondary appointments in the School of Engineering, an appointment in Electrical and Systems Engineering and an appointment in Materials Science and Engineering. In 2008, he received a full professorship. Johnson served as the Associate Chair for Undergraduate Affairs from 2005 to 2011. Since 2011, he has been the Associate Chair of Graduate Affairs.

Since he began working at Penn, Johnson has taught both undergraduate and graduate-level courses. These courses range from introductory physics to advanced statistical mechanics and thermodynamics.

Research at Penn
Johnson has been a leading researcher at Penn since he began working there in 1994.  He summarizes his research in his CV, which is available on his website:
My research interests include transport phenomena (charge, energy, and spin) in nanoscale systems, including carbon nanotubes and graphene, and hybrid nanostructures based on these materials conjugated with proteins, synthetic peptides, and DNA. Recent research accomplishments include the Creation of bio-inspired vapor sensors based on carbon nanotube transistors functionalized with mammalian olfactory receptors. Crystallographic etching of graphene. Large-scale production of very large graphene oxide membranes. Demonstration of Feedback Controlled Electromigration, an atomically precise fabrication method for nanogap contacts for molecular electronics (patent pending). The invention of a DNA/Nanotube Gas Sensor appropriate for use in an electronic nose system (patent awarded), and quantitative comparison of experiment with all-atom Molecular Dynamics simulation. Development of a quantitative theory of Scanning Conductance Microscopy, including a demonstration of direct measurement of the dielectric constant of a polymer nanowire. Quantitative characterization of individual defects in a nanotube device. First fabrication of air-stable, n-type nanotube field effect transistors. Design and demonstration of a nanotube memory cell. Discovery and control of the Schottky barriers in carbon nanotube field-effect transistors using Scanning Gate Microscopy. First observation of the impurity-induced conversion of a nanotube FET into a nanotube diode, and elucidation of the mechanism. Demonstration of 20nm channel nanotube FETs and quantum dots. Discovery of 1-dimensional quantized phonon subbands in nanotubes. The first production of nanotube-epoxy composite materials for thermal management (patent pending). Fabrication of “nanogap” electrical contacts for molecular electronic circuits (patent awarded).

Johnson has received over 25 grants for his research, given 97 talks related to his work, and supervised over 120 students in conducting research.  He has been an author or co-author on over 140 papers, and received 9 patents.

As Director of the Nano/Bio Interface Center at Penn, Johnson oversees all research conducted therein, but is the principal investigator for the Biomolecular Optoelectronic Function project.  This project is aimed at using organic and inorganic nanostructures to control energy transfer between various pieces of nanotechnology.  One of the goals of the project is to interface biological and nanotechnological structures to create new materials that may have wide-ranging biological and medical applications.  The team has created a novel approach to fabricating certain nanostructures, which has allowed the research to proceed successfully since it began.

Charlie Johnson Group
Johnson also founded and leads the Charlie Johnson Group, aimed at Experimental Nanoscale Physics.  As the principal investigator, Johnson leads the four ongoing research projects, which are Molecular Electronics, Local Probes of Nanoscale Systems, Chemical and Biological Sensing, and Nanotube and Nanowire Electronics.  Among his assistant researchers are postdoctoral fellows, graduate students, and undergraduate students.

Companies and publications founded

Graphene Frontiers
Johnson co-founded Graphene Frontiers, LLC through the UPStarts program in 2010.  The company was selected for the National Science Foundation I-Corps program in 2011 and received an NSF SBIR grant in 2012.  Graphene Frontiers is one of the leading graphene manufacturers in the world, using novel techniques to create the one-atom-thick sheet.

Adamant Technologies
Johnson also co-founded Adamant Technologies, which is a start-up aimed at personalizing the healthcare industry, which was started as part of the Johnson Group.  The company, based out of San Francisco, has "developed a novel mobile chemical sensor device that allows users to track their health and fitness through chemicals in their breath." The company is currently working on a related smartphone application.

AIP Advances

Johnson is the Founding Executive Editor of AIP Advances, a peer-reviewed journal published by the American Institute of Physics.

Honors and awards
Johnson received the Danforth Center Award for excellence as a teaching fellow at Harvard in 1987.  He was a National Science Foundation fellow from 1984 to 1986, a European Union ESPRIT postdoctoral fellow from 1990 to 1992, a National Research Council postdoc fellow from 1992 to 1993, a David and Lucille Packard Foundation Science and Engineering fellow from 1994 to 1999, and an Alfred P. Sloan Research Fellow in 1995.

He received the Jack Raper Outstanding Technology Directions Paper Award in 1999, the Lindback Foundation Award for distinguished teaching at the University of Pennsylvania in 2003, the Dean's Award for Undergraduate Research Mentorship in 2011 and became a Fellow of the American Physical Society in 2011.

See also
Nanotechnology
AIP Advances
Graphene
Carbon nanotubes

References

Year of birth missing (living people)
Living people
Harvard University alumni
21st-century American physicists
University of Pennsylvania faculty
Stanford University alumni
Place of birth missing (living people)